Faustino Francisco Félix Chávez (born 21 October 1967) is a Mexican politician affiliated with the PRI. He served as Deputy of the LXII Legislature of the Mexican Congress representing Sonora. He was elected municipal president of Cajeme in 2015.

References

1967 births
Living people
Politicians from Sonora
Members of the Chamber of Deputies (Mexico) for Sonora
Institutional Revolutionary Party politicians
21st-century Mexican politicians
Members of the Congress of Sonora
Municipal presidents in Sonora
Deputies of the LXII Legislature of Mexico